Cancer are a British extreme metal band formed in Ironbridge, Shropshire, in 1988. Over the course of their career, they have released six full-length albums, including one for the major label East West, and broke up twice (in 1996 and 2006). The band reformed once again in 2013.

History

Early career and To the Gory End (1988–1990) 
Cancer was formed one night in 1988 in the Tontine public house in Ironbridge, Shropshire, by drummer Carl Stokes, guitarist John Walker and bassist Ian Buchanan. The band quickly put together their first two-track demo, No Fuckin' Cover, at the Pits studio in Birmingham, owned by ex-Starfighters vocalist Steve Burton. The demo was produced by Stevie Young (nephew of AC/DC's Angus Young) and engineered by "Big" Mick Hughes (live sound engineer for Metallica). The band also began playing live, starting with their first gig in Birmingham opening for Bomb Disneyland, and including shows with the likes of Bolt Thrower, Cerebral Fix and GBH.

A second demo session was recorded in 1989, and was followed shortly by the bootleg live album Bloodbath in the Acid, recorded at Wrexham Memorial Hall and pressed on the Headache label. However, No Fuckin' Cover had secured Cancer a deal with Vinyl Solution and in Winter 1989 the band recorded their debut album, To the Gory End, over four days at Loco Studios in Usk. The record was then mixed by Scott Burns (record producer) at Morrisound Studios, with backing vocals from John Tardy (of Obituary) added to the track "Die, Die", and released in April 1990. The band followed it up with tours with Obituary and Deicide.

Death Shall Rise and The Sins of Mankind (1991–1993) 
Cancer started preparing material for their second album at Reel to Reel Studios in Telford with engineer Tony Higley, and in February 1991 flew out to Florida to begin recording Death Shall Rise with Scott Burns at Morrisound. They enlisted the skills of James Murphy (of Agent Steel and Obituary) on lead guitar, and Deicide's Glen Benton to provide backing vocals for lead track "Hung, Drawn and Quartered". Released in April 1991, the album would go on to gain a certain amount of notoriety owing to being banned in Germany, whose state body for censorship of works likely to be dangerous to youth considered that the cover art would incite youngsters to incite violence upon each other. The album would also subsequently go on to be placed No. 27 in Terrorizers Top 40 Death Metal Albums. Throughout May, Cancer toured throughout the UK supported by Unleashed and Desecrator, then returned to US for an appearance at the 1991 Milwaukee Metal Festival and further touring in support of Deicide and Obituary.

James Murphy left the band in December 1991 to form Disincarnate and was replaced by Barry Savage. This was followed by further touring throughout the US, Mexico, Israel and Europe. The band recorded their third album, The Sins of Mankind, with Simon Efemey at the Windings in Wrexham in December 1992. Following its release through Vinyl Solution in June 1993, Cancer embarked on a European tour with openers Cerebral Fix. Problems arose when drummer Stokes was involved in an accident when his motorbike collided with a British Telecom van, leading to the band enlisting Nicholas Barker (later of Cradle of Filth and Dimmu Borgir) for further live shows.

Black Faith and split (1994–1996) 
In 1994, Cancer left Vinyl Solution to sign to major label East West for worldwide distribution, one of the first death metal bands to do so. They entered Great Linford Studios in Milton Keynes, again with Simon Efemey at the helm, to record their fourth effort, Black Faith; the record was later mixed at Pink Floyd's Brittania Row Studios. Despite Stokes allegedly using a human thigh bone for percussion on "Temple Song", the record received decidedly mixed reviews; some compared the Black Faith material to mid-period Metallica, whilst others considered it a "poor man's Heartwork". Following a short European tour with support act Meshuggah, Cancer decided to call it a day, citing "a lack of faith from certain key individuals in the industry and Major Label Bullshit".

Reunion (2013–present) 
On 12 September 2013, it was announced that the original lineup of Cancer was reuniting to promote their first three albums (To the Gory End, Death Shall Rise and The Sins of Mankind) which would be re-released by Cyclone Empire Records later that year. They were also planning to make a number of festival appearances, where they would only play songs from the aforementioned albums.

On 22 September 2015, Cancer revealed on their Facebook page that they have been working on new material. In July 2018, they signed to Peaceville Records and would release their new album, tentatively titled Shadow Gripped, late in the year. In August 2018, Shadow Gripped was confirmed as the title of the band's next album, which was released on 2 November 2018.

Members 

Current lineup
 John Walker – vocals, guitar (1987–1996, 2003–2006, 2013–present)
 Daniel Maganto - bass (2022–present)
 Gabriel Valcázar - drums (2022–present)

Past members
 Ian Buchanan – bass (1987–1996, 2013–2022)
 Carl Stokes – drums (1987–1996, 2003–2006, 2013–2022)
 James Murphy – guitar (1991)
 Barry Savage – guitar (1993–1996, 2013–2014)
 Rob Engvikson – guitar (2003–2004)
 Dave Leitch – guitar (2004–2006)
 Adam Richardson – bass (2003–2006)

Live members
 Nicholas Barker – drums (1993)

Timeline

Discography

Studio albums 
 To the Gory End (Vinyl Solution, 1990)
 Death Shall Rise (Vinyl Solution, 1991)
 The Sins of Mankind (Vinyl Solution, 1993)
 Black Faith (East West, 1995)
 Spirit in Flames (Copro, 2005)
 Shadow Gripped (Peaceville Records, 2018)

EPs 
 Corporation$ (Copro, 2004)
 Ballcutter (Peaceville, 2019)

Demos 
 No Fuckin' Cover (1988)
 Demo No. 2 (1989)

Split albums 
 Live Death – split LP with Suffocation, Malevolent Creation and Exhorder (Restless Records, 1993)

References 

English thrash metal musical groups
English death metal musical groups
Musical groups established in 1988
Musical groups disestablished in 1996
Musical groups reestablished in 2003
Musical groups disestablished in 2006
Musical groups reestablished in 2013
People from Ironbridge
Musical quartets